Andamlak Belihu (born 20 November 1998) is an Ethiopian long-distance runner. He competed in the 10,000 metres at the 2017 World Athletics Championships, where he finished 10th with a time of 27:08.94. In 2019, he competed in the men's 10,000 metres at the 2019 World Athletics Championships held in Doha, Qatar. He finished in 5th place.

Personal bests
Outdoor
10,000 metres – 27:08.94 (London 2017)
Half marathon – 59:10 (New Delhi Half Marathon 2019)
Marathon - 2:06:40 (Berlin Marathon 2022)

Road
10 kilometres – 27:48 (Ottawa 2018)

References

External links

1998 births
Living people
Ethiopian male long-distance runners
World Athletics Championships athletes for Ethiopia
21st-century Ethiopian people